26th parallel may refer to:

26th parallel north, a circle of latitude in the Northern Hemisphere
26th parallel south, a circle of latitude in the Southern Hemisphere